The National Youth Service (NYS) is an organisation under the Government of Kenya. It was established in 1964 to train young people in important national matters. In 2019, the organization was transformed from a state department to a fully fledged semi-autonomous state corporation after enactment of NYS act, 2018] by the Kenyan parliament.

 
The core business of NYS is to train and mentor Kenya's youth through :

 Paramilitary and regimentation . 
 National building programs. 
 Technical and vocational training in various skills and trades .

Enrollment
Enrollment to the service is voluntary for Kenyan youth aged between 18 –22 years old . Upon enlistment, the recruits are subjected to rigorous non-combat paramilitary training for 6 months .

The recruits are required to offer at least 6 months of national service, which may include;

Construction
Vector control
 Slums upgrade program
 Traffic Control
 Public security
 Agriculture

Before the late 1980s, students had to participate in the organisation before admission into universities. Today, recruitment is done on a volunteer basis.

After successfully completing the compulsory national service, the recruits are sent to technical and vocational schools within NYS to train in various fields such as agriculture, engineering and hospitality. The training is free of charge to all recruits .

List of NYS TVET Colleges

NYS Institute of Business Studies  -Nairobi.
NYS Engineering college.
Nairobi Craft school.
NYS yatta college.
Textile college.
Advanced Building school- Gilgil.
NYS Technical college Mombasa.
Rural craft school Turbo.
NYS driving school.
Plant operator school -Kerio Valley.
Early childhood college -Naivasha.

History

National Youth Service was established with the assistance of Israeli government, it was inspired by Nahal (fighting poineer youth) and GADNA (Youth battalion) models which combined military service and the establishment of agricultural settlements.

While in Israel the movement was necessary to deal with existential threats from Palestine and Arab world, in Kenya the model was attractive to the government to instill national values to the young people and to rehabilitate the freedom fighters (mau mau).

The Israeli had hoped to use the youth training as their entry point to Africa. And besides Kenya, they had such programmes in Nigeria, Tanzania and Uganda.

The crafting of the NYS could have started earlier than is publicly acknowledged.

In mid-1959, Mboya had led a delegation to Israel where he – and other African leaders – had been introduced to the Gadna-Nahal movement, during a six-week seminar.

The conference was organised by the CIA-funded International Union of the Socialist Youth (IUSY), which frequently published Mboya's articles on African socialism.

Gadna was an acronym meaning youth formations, while Nahal meant fighting pioneer youth. These were youth organisations controlled and financed by the Israeli government to instil a sense of "national purpose", and to "conduct civic and social duties".

Upon his return to Nairobi, Mr Mboya told the press: "In Israel I have seen youths trained so that they are a source of pride to the nation, and they are readily available for all sorts of national work programmes".

As a result of the lessons learnt in Israel, Mboya hoped to transform the youth wing of his People's Congress Party into a formidable political tool.

It was this Mboya-Kariuki group that would work with the Israelis to set up the National Youth Service all as part of Israel's efforts to build close ties with the Kenyatta administration.

Kenya had hoped to adopt Israel's Nahal experiment in uniting the Kenyan tribes using the youth organisations. Israel also impressed upon president Kenyatta to embrace the Kibbutz idea – a collective community farming system manned by trained youth as pioneers.

In February 1966, a Motion was brought to Parliament by Embu's J.G. Mbogo seeking the disbandment of the Israeli-funded unit arguing that the youth were being trained "for somebody to stand up there and look very big".To protect the Israeli project from disbandment, it was included as part of disciplined forces in the April 1966 amendment of the Kenya Constitution.

Overall, the Nahal movement as crafted by the Israelis in East Africa failed.

Steven Carol, a foreign policy scholar on the Nahal says that the East African experiment did not yield fruit because most of the youth were illiterate and unlike the Israelis "they had no avowed enemy, or marauding terrorists across the border".

With the failed NYS project, the Israelis now turned to training Kenyans in the field of intelligence and security.

Later, the Chinese took over the funding and introduced pre-university training which was later abandoned  . Not to be left behind, the Italians helped set up the Nyayo-bus project which again collapsed.

Over the years, NYS has had to redefine itself to take a life of its own after the failed Israeli model. The first director, Geoffrey Griffin, a distinguished disciplinarian steered the organisation through the early turbulent years to stability (1964-1988). NYS remained an obscure and meagerly funded organisation government department for many years until 2013 when the president Uhuru Kenyatta government decided to make it a major institution for youth empowerment .

NYS budget was increased by 1000% in 2014, But there was problem; the organization had severely limited human resource capacity to manage huge budgets nor technical capacity to carry out the projects it claimed it could do . Many of the NYS rank and file have limited education, limited experience and poor ethical attitude to manage the huge budgets. Further the organization has over the years become unnecessarily over militarized therefore thwarting internal accountability and professionalism. What followed was massive misuse and monumental wastage of the public funds .

To address these challenges, the government in 2018 began a journey of reforms at NYS that was aimed at dealing with endemic integrity problems, building capacity and professionalizing the organization. NYS was made a parastatal with a council to run its affairs.

Members of the NYS council

 Lt. Gen (Rtd) Njuki Mwaniki - chairman.
 Matilda Pamela Aleyo Sakwa   -Director General.
 Maj.Gen Fatuma Ahmed  -Kenya Defense Forces representative.
 Vincent Ombaka   
 Ali Sahal Idris   
 Adhan Nuri Berhe   
 David Murithi Githendu    
 Dr. Nkatha Gichuiya   
 (Representative from Treasury )   
 (Representative from Ministry of interior )   
 (Representative from ministry responsible for youth affairs)

References

External links 
 http://nys.go.ke

Government agencies of Kenya
Government paramilitary forces